The Federation of Hong Kong Industries (FHKI) is a business organization for the industrial companies in Hong Kong established under the Federation of Hong Kong Industries Ordinance,  of the laws of Hong Kong, in 1960.

Objectives
The objectives of the Federation are:
 to promote and foster the interests of Hong Kong's industrial and business communities
 to promote trade, investment, technological advancement, manpower development, and business opportunities in Hong Kong
 to represent business's views and advise the government on policies and legislation which affect business
The General Committee is the Federation's policy-making and management authority, while the Secretariat is responsible for policy implementation and day-to-day operations.

References

Chambers of commerce in Hong Kong
1960 establishments in Hong Kong